Juliette and Friends is a Canadian talk show television series which aired on CBC Television from 1973 to 1975.

Premise
This talk show was hosted by Juliette who was regularly featured on CBC Television and in her own series from the mid-1950s until 1966. Various topics were presented, with theme days on interior decorating (Tuesdays) and new artists (Thursdays). She was joined by different co-hosts during the series run, namely Larry Solway, Bill Lawrence or Doug Lennox.

Scheduling
This half-hour series was broadcast weekdays at 2:00 p.m. (Eastern) from 17 September 1973 to 6 May 1974, followed by rebroadcast episodes until 6 September 1974. The series moved to the 3:00 p.m. weekday time slot in the second season from 9 September 1974 to 12 September 1975.

External links
 
 

CBC Television original programming
1973 Canadian television series debuts
1975 Canadian television series endings